Ahmed El Nouemany(born 5 February 1971), commonly known as Nakhla,  is a former footballer of the Egypt national football team.

Club career
Nakhla spent his professional career in the Egyptian Premier League with Arab Contractors SC , Al-Ahly, Al-Masry, Baladeyet El-Mahalla and Tanta FC.

International career
Nakhla was a member in Egypt team in 1992 Summer Olympics.

References

External links
 
 
 

1971 births
Living people
Egyptian footballers
Egypt international footballers
Footballers from Cairo
Olympic footballers of Egypt
Footballers at the 1992 Summer Olympics
Al Mokawloon Al Arab SC players
Al Ahly SC players
Al Masry SC players
Egyptian Premier League players
Association football defenders
Tanta SC players
Baladeyet El Mahalla SC players